Shaikh Jamiruddin (1870 – 2 June 1937) was a writer and Islamic preacher.

Biography
Jamiruddin was born on 1870 in the village of Garadobe Bahadurpur of Gangni of Meherpur. His father was Sufi Shaykh Muhammad Amiruddin, son of Shaykh Muhammad Baqer Uddin, and his mother was Lafiran Bibi. He studied in Meherpur Amjhupi Christian School and Krishnanagar Normal School. He converted to Christianity in 1887. After that he changed his name into John Jamiruddin.

Jamiruddin graduated from St. Paul's Divinity College, Allahabad in theology in 1891. Later, he got admitted into Divinity College, Kolkata. He studied Christianity and Sanskrit, Arabic, Greek and Hebrew literature and grammar from there. He knew Bangla,  English, Urdu,  Persian and  Latin.

Jamiruddin wrote an article titled Asol Koran Kothay in the Khristiyo Bandhob on June 1892. In reply Munshi Mohammad Meherullah wrote an article titled Isayi Ba Khristani Dhoka Bhonjon that was published in the Sudhakar on 20 and 27 June 1892 where he gave the answers of his six questions.

Later, Jamiruddin wrote an article the Sudhakor. In reply Munshi Mohammad Meherullah wrote an article titled Asol Koran Sorbotro. After reading this article Jamiruddin decided to convert himself into Islam.

Jamiruddin wrote books on religious issue. He translated and wrote books on social issues too. He wrote books like Hazrat Isa Ke, Meher Charit, Islami Baktrita, Shrestha Nabi Hazrat Mohammad (SM), Padrir Dhokavonjon and more. He wrote an autobiography titled Amar Jiboni O Islam Grahan Brittanto.

Jamiruddin died on 2 June 1937. He was buried in his family graveyard.

References

Bengali Muslim scholars of Islam
1870 births
1937 deaths
People from Meherpur District
Converts to Christianity from Islam
Converts to Islam from Christianity
Bengali writers
Bangladeshi translators
19th-century Bengalis
20th-century Bengalis